Wahoo Run was a family water slide at Adventure Island in Tampa, Florida, operated by SeaWorld Parks and Entertainment. The 600-foot-long ProSlide Mammoth River was mostly enclosed. Riders aboard three-person roundrafts pass through four waterfall curtains before ending in a splash pool. Wahoo Run was named for a game fish, the wahoo, and for the "screaming expected from riders".

In 2022, the ride will reopen as Wahoo Remix. The former dark sections will be illuminated with multi-color LED lights synchronized with sound elements.

References

Adventure Island (water park)
Amusement rides introduced in 2000
Water rides
2000 establishments in Florida